Princess Françoise d'Orléans (Françoise Isabelle Louise Marie; 25 December 1902 – 25 February 1953) was born an Orléans Princess of France and became a Princess of Greece and Denmark by marriage. She was thus a member of the Greek royal family and a descendant of the "Citizen-King" Louis-Philippe.

Family

Françoise d'Orléans was born in Paris, the second daughter of Jean d'Orléans, duc de Guise (an Orléanist pretender to the throne of France under the name Jean III) and his wife, the French Princess Isabelle of Orléans. Françoise's brother, Prince Henri, Count of Paris, succeeded their father as the Orleanist pretender, under the name Henri VI.

In Palermo on 11 February 1929, she married Prince Christopher of Greece and Denmark (1888–1940).  This was Christopher's second marriage - he was the youngest son of King George I of Greece (1845–1913) and his wife, Grand Duchess Olga Constantinovna of Russia (1851–1926). Through his father, he was thus a grandson of King Christian IX of Denmark (1818–1906), nicknamed "the father-in-law of Europe" due to his six children all marrying into other royal families.

This royal marriage was unusual in that era, with a Catholic marrying a non-Catholic (he was Greek Orthodox, whilst she was Roman Catholic).  They had only one child, the writer Prince Michael of Greece and Denmark (born 1939), whose marriage to the Greek artist Marina Karella (born 1940) did not conform to the laws of the royal house and thus deprived him of all right of succession to the Greek throne.

Ancestry

Notes

Bibliography
 Christopher of Greece, Memoirs of HRH Prince Christopher of Greece, The Right Book Club, London, 1938.
  Michael of Greece and Henri of Orléans, comte de Paris, Mon album de famille, Perrin, 1996. 
  Michael of Greece, Mémoires insolites, Xo, Paris, 2004 
  Isabelle, countess of Paris, Tout m'est bonheur, Éditions Robert Laffont, Coll. « Vécu », Paris, 1978. 
  Ricardo Mateos Sainz de Medrano, La Familia de la Reina Sofía, La Dinastía griega, la Casa de Hannover y los reales primos de Europa, La Esfera de los Libros, Madrid, 2004 

1902 births
1953 deaths
House of Glücksburg (Greece)
Princesses of France (Orléans)
Nobility from Paris
Greek princesses
Danish princesses
Burials at Tatoi Palace Royal Cemetery